Ayla Erduran (born 22 September 1934, Istanbul) is a Turkish violinist. A student of Karl Berger she performed her first recital when she was 10 years old. She then went on to study at the Paris International Conservatory from 1946 to 1951 under Benedetti and Benvenuti. After her graduation she went on to United States, where she stayed until 1955, and studied with Ivan Galamian and Zino Francescatti.

From 1957 to 1958, Erduran studied under David Oistrakh at Moscow Conservatory.

Her career as a violin teacher spanned between 1973 and 1990 in Switzerland, including her master's classes at the Lausanne Conservatory.

Erduran earned the title of a state artist in 1971. She has also received a gold medal from the Ankara-based Sevda Cenap And Music Foundation (SCAMV). She won the fifth place prize in the Henryk Wieniawski Violin Competition in 1957, the Harriet Cohen-Olga Veryney Award in 1964, and the Beethoven Award of the Netherlands in 1970.

Her performances with major orchestras includes the London Symphony, Suisse Romande, Berlin RIAS, Presidential Symphony Orchestra, and Czech Philharmonia. She has also worked with several conductors including Ernest Ansermet, Karel Ancerl, Paul Kletzki, Gennadi Rozhdetsvenski, Jean Fournet, Michel Plasson and Armin Jordan. Locations of her concerts include South Korea, the US, Canada, Middle East, India, Africa, Russia, Azerbaijan, and Turkey. She premiered Ulvi Cemal Erkin's violin concerto in 1958, conducted by Ulvi Cemal Erkin, in Belgium. Erduran also performed the Sibelius's violin concerto with Suisse Romande Orchestra, conducted by Ernest Ansermet, on the occasion of the 100th anniversary of Sibelius in Geneva. Her performances were broadcast on radio in England, Germany, Brazil, Bulgaria, Russia, Poland, Iraq, the Netherlands, and the US.

Erduran has had duet performances with notable musicians such as Yehudi Menuhin, Henryk Szeryng, Navarra String Quartet, Igor Oistrakh, Valery Oistrakh, Victor Pikaizen, Guy Fallot, Collins, and Mieczyslaw Weinberg.

References 

1934 births
Turkish violinists
Living people
21st-century violinists
Women classical violinists
Academic staff of Lausanne Conservatory